On 1–2 December 2021 a group of unidentified militants attacked a military outpost in Porga, Atakora Department, northwestern Benin near its border with Burkina Faso. 

During the attack, two soldiers were killed and several others wounded. One of the attackers was slain by military forces. It has been suggested that the militants could have come from Burkina Faso, which has been fighting a low-intensity conflict against salafi jihadists since 2015. Colonel Didier Ahouanvoédo said that "traces of blood were seen suggesting that other dead or wounded were dragged in the direction of the withdrawal towards a neighboring country [Burkina Faso] where terrorist groups are rife."

The day before, a terrorist attack had occurred in Alibori Department, also in northern Benin, resulting in one of the terrorist's being killed. These two incidents were the second terrorist attacks in Benin since 2019, when Islamists kidnapped a pair of French tourists.

On 10 December militants raided Porga again, leaving four people injured.

References 

2021 in Benin
2021 murders in Africa
Atakora Department
December 2021 crimes in Africa
Murder in Benin
Terrorist incidents in Africa in 2021
Terrorist incidents in Benin
2020s murders in Benin
2021 crimes in Benin